Palmai Rural LLG is a local-level government (LLG) of Sandaun Province, Papua New Guinea.

Wards
01. Kuvalvu
02. Monandin
03. Nangen
04. Yadagaro
05. Sundun (Bragat language speakers)
06. Kolembi
07. Sumambum
08. Asier
09. Binare
10. Boini
11. Wara
12. Muku
13. Yeresi
14. Sabig
15. Mai
19. Yambil
20. Sengi
21. Yolpa
22. Munumbal

References

Local-level governments of Sandaun Province